Dudleya anomala is a rare species of succulent plant in the family Crassulaceae commonly known as the Todos Santos liveforever. With a dense, cushion-forming habit, this leaf succulent is characterized by elongated stems, slightly sticky leaves, and bell-shaped flowers with white, spreading petals. This species is native to Baja California, Mexico, and is found primarily on islands and one coastal locality.

Description

Morphology 
Dudleya anomala is a rosette-forming leaf succulent that grows in a caespitose habit, with the stems branching to form dense cushions of rosettes  in diameter. Topping the stems are the rosettes, which contain 20 to 30 close-set leaves, that may become somewhat separated when the stem is rapidly elongating. The leaves are shaped strap-oblanceolate to strap-shaped, with acute tips. The lower surface of the leaf is convex, while the upper surface is only slightly convex. The leaf margins are obtuse or rounded, but not toward the base. The leaves are slightly viscid.

The bracts are shaped narrowly deltoid-ovate to deltoid-lanceolate, with sharply acute tips.

The petals are somewhat spreading from the base, with the tips curving outward. The petals are white, but somewhat flecked on the keel with red.

Characteristics 
D. anomala possesses slightly viscid (sticky) and odorous foliage, a trait only shared by the aptly-named Dudleya viscida. In comparison, anomala has smaller leaves, thinner caudices, and smaller, simpler inflorescences.

Taxonomy

Taxonomic history 
Anstruther Davidson first described the species as Stylophyllum anomalum in 1928, based on a specimen collected by Robert Kessler from North Coronado Island and deposited in the herbarium of the Los Angeles County Museum by Davidson. Harald August Fröderström described Stylophyllum insulare based on a specimen collected by Marcus E. Jones from the Coronado Islands in 1926. This name later became a homonym, so it was changed to Stylophyllum coronatum. Philip A. Munz also observed this species on the Coronado Islands, referring to it as Echeveria virens.

Reid Moran wrote a more complete description of the species in 1943, and recognized it as a Dudleya, creating the current combination.

Phylogenetics 
A 2013 phylogenetic analysis of D. anomala places it in a clade with Dudleya anthonyi.

Distribution and habitat 
Dudleya anomala is only found in the state of Baja California, Mexico and has an insular distribution on the Islas Coronados, Isla Todos Santos, and one location on the mainland, the extreme point of the Punta Banda. The range of D. anomala overlaps with those of Dudleya lanceolata, Dudleya candida, and Dudleya attenuata. 

Specimens of D. anomala observed by Reid Moran occurred on steep, north-facing cliffs on the Coronado Islands. On the Isla Todos Santos, the plant is found densely covering rocks and cliffs on northern and eastern exposures. On the Punta Banda, this species is found on steep, north-facing beach cliffs overlooking the Todos Santos Bay. Populations of Dudleya anomala are consistently associated with Niebla ceruchoides.

Gallery

References

External links 

 Dudleya anomala at CalPhotos

anomala
Flora of Baja California
Endemic flora of Mexico
Taxa named by Reid Venable Moran